During the 1928–29 English football season, Brentford competed in the Football League Third Division South. An unbeaten start to the season was cancelled out by a run of 11 defeats in 12 games which left the Bees bottom of the Football League, but the team recovered to finish in mid-table.

Season summary

Still in search of a winning formula after two mid-table finishes, Brentford manager Harry Curtis elected to add to rather than remodel of his squad during the 1928 off-season. In came goalkeeper Freddie Fox, full back Baden Herod for a £1,500 club record fee, half back Reginald Davies and a number of young forwards. He also brought in his former Gillingham trainer Bob Kane. Youngster Joe Wiggins broke Brentford's outgoing transfer record in May 1928, with Leicester City paying £1,400 for a centre forward who had made just four senior appearances and scored two goals.

Good goalscoring form from Jack Lane and Jack Phillips at the start of the season saw Brentford go seven matches unbeaten and rise to the top of the table. Phillips was then sold to Bristol Rovers and a run of 12 league matches without a win (including a club record-equalling 9 league defeats in a row) plummeted the club to the bottom of the Football League. Manager Curtis was offered the manager's job of an unnamed Second Division club in mid-October, but elected to stay at Griffin Park.

In November 1928, Manager Harry Curtis pulled off a crucial £500 signing of Jimmy Bain from Manchester Central and the centre half galvanised the team. Just three defeats in 18 matches between Boxing Day 1928 and April Fools' Day 1929 averted any fears of having to campaign for re-election. Manager Curtis decided to cash in on club record signing Baden Herod, who was sold for a then-club record outgoing fee of £4,000 to Tottenham Hotspur in February 1929. Just one draw from the final five matches of the season dropped Brentford to a final placing of 13th. A minor competition, the London Charity Fund, was won in November 1928 and gold medals were presented to the players involved.

League table

Results
Brentford's goal tally listed first.

Legend

Football League Third Division South

FA Cup

 Sources: Statto, 11v11, 100 Years of Brentford

Playing squad 
Players' ages are as of the opening day of the 1928–29 season.

 Sources: Timeless Bees, Football League Players' Records 1888 to 1939, 100 Years Of Brentford

Coaching staff

Statistics

Appearances and goals

Players listed in italics left the club mid-season.
Source: 100 Years of Brentford

Goalscorers 

Players listed in italics left the club mid-season.
Source: 100 Years of Brentford

Amateur international caps

Management

Summary

Transfers & loans 
Cricketers are not included in this list.

References 

Brentford F.C. seasons
Brentford